Talni (Talene), or Tallensi, is a Gur language of Burkina Faso and Ghana.

References

Oti–Volta languages
Languages of Ghana
Languages of Burkina Faso
Articles citing ISO change requests